Heritage Christian Academy is a private K-12 Christian school located in Rockwall, Texas. Founded in 1995, it offers grades Pre-K3-12th. The school is accredited by the Association of Christian Schools International (ACSI) and the Accreditation Commission of the Texas Association of Baptist Schools (ACTABS).

External links

Christian schools in Texas
Private K-12 schools in Texas
Schools in Rockwall County, Texas
Educational institutions established in 1995
1995 establishments in Texas